The Plainview Hardware Company Building, at 210 S. Main St. in Perryton, Texas, was listed on the National Register of Historic Places in 1990.

It is a two-story masonry Art Deco-style building, with a dressed limestone veneer on its front and common bond brick on its sides and rear. The Art Deco style is expressed by carved limestone
with bas relief detailing creating angular geometric forms, including some squares, and floral motifs.

See also

National Register of Historic Places listings in Ochiltree County, Texas

References

National Register of Historic Places in Ochiltree County, Texas
Art Deco architecture in Texas